Girl in a Blue Dress, also called Portrait of a Girl Dressed in Blue or simply Portrait of a Girl, is an oil painting by Johannes Cornelisz Verspronck in the collection of the Rijksmuseum. It was acquired by the museum in 1928 as a gift from the Vereniging Rembrandt. The identity of the girl and her family are unknown.

Provenance
In 1912 the wealthy merchant and art collector Mari Paul Voûte (1856–1928) became chairman of the Vereniging Rembrandt. At the end of World War I, when Frederick Augustus II, Grand Duke of Oldenburg was forced to abdicate and needed to downsize, his art collection came on the market and in 1923 the Vereniging Rembrandt formed a consortium with senior members to purchase artworks from this collection at their own risk in order to give them to the Amsterdam museum. The Girl in Blue was one of these artworks purchased by Voûte. Rather than giving it directly to the museum, however, he kept it until he died, whereupon he bequeathed it to the Vereniging Rembrandt for them to make over to the Rijksmuseum, which they did.

The painting is very similar in composition to a pendant marriage portrait painted by Verspronck the year before, today in the collection of the Rijksmuseum Twenthe:

References

External links 
 

Paintings by Johannes Cornelisz Verspronck
1641 paintings
17th-century portraits
Portraits by Dutch artists
Portraits of women
Paintings in the collection of the Rijksmuseum
Paintings of children